Rebecca Chircop (born 6 July 1988) is a Maltese former footballer who played as a defender. She has been a member of the Malta women's national team.

References

1988 births
Living people
Women's association football defenders
Maltese women's footballers
Malta women's international footballers
Mosta F.C. players
Birkirkara F.C. (women) players